Behold the Kickmen is a football video game developed and published by Size Five Games. It was released on 20 July 2017 for Windows, Mac OS X, and Linux on the Steam platform and on the Nintendo Switch on 18 June 2020.

It received mixed reception from critics, who were highly polarized in their opinions of the game's humor and gameplay.

Gameplay 
The game features a football-like approximation with the rules drastically changed to incorporate some from baseball and basketball. The pitch is round rather than rectangular, players score more if they kick the ball from farther away, the goalkeepers are called "goldkeepers", and the game makes a "mockery" of the offside rule. However, the goal remains generally the same, to score by kicking a ball into the other player's goal. The player can control one team member at a time, "charging" and "hyper-curving" the ball.

Plot 
The game features a story mode about a "kickman" who must solve the mystery of his father's death, while rising up the ranks and dealing with a bully from another team.

Development 
The game began as a Twitter joke on the feed of the game's developer, Dan Marshall, saying that he wanted to create a soccer game without knowing anything about the sport. After making a prototype as a "personal Game Jam", due to being "bogged down" by his current project at the time, he received surprisingly enthusiastic feedback. He decided to develop said game, which took over a year to develop.

The fact that the player can reveal what team members the AI would pass the ball to in order to prevent frustration was inspired by Mike Cook, an AI researcher who stated that telling the player what the AI was thinking was more important than making one that was "very, very intelligent".

Marshall stated that he himself dislikes football and created the game's story mode to "share" his "disdain". He said that while there was a large amount of positive reaction to the game, he also faced "genuine anger" from fans who "didn't realize it was a big joke".

The game's music was composed by Tobey Evans, who incorporated "faux dubstep" and chiptune elements.

Reception 
The game received mixed reception from critics, with reception to it being highly divided.

Daniel Cooper of Engadget called the game "truly original" and, while calling the gameplay its "weakest element", said that it was "enormously satisfying" when it worked, saying that its price was so low that "you can't not buy it". John Bridgman of Gamasutra said that the game fulfilled its goals of being both funny and engaging.

Jon Denton of PC Gamer rated the game 26/100, calling the gameplay "sluggish chaos" and saying that most goals come from the "extreme ineptitude of the goldkeepers" rather than "anything resembling efficient play". He called the game's humor "smug" and "run through the filter of a mild superiority complex", noting that it was not "insightful or funny". Graham Smith of Rock, Paper, Shotgun criticized the AI as being poorly balanced and the gameplay "sloppy" and "erratic". He also stated that he found the game's humor "off-putting" and "mean-spirited", saying that it targeted "the sport's fans" and would only appeal to those who felt "assaulted" by football.

References 

2017 video games
Association football video games
Windows games
MacOS games
Indie video games
Video games developed in the United Kingdom
Nintendo Switch games
Size Five Games games